The Hans J. Hagge Boathouse is located in Hazelhurst, Wisconsin, United States. It was added to the National Register of Historic Places in 2005.

History
The boathouse was commissioned by Hans J. Hagge. Hagge was a prominent businessman from Wausau, Wisconsin.

References

Boathouses in the United States
Buildings and structures completed in 1939
Buildings and structures in Oneida County, Wisconsin
National Register of Historic Places in Oneida County, Wisconsin
Boathouses on the National Register of Historic Places in Wisconsin